Morgan le Fay is an 1864 oil-on-wood painting by British Pre-Raphaelite painter Frederick Sandys which portrays the legendary witch and King Arthur's sister, Morgan le Fay. Keomi Gray, Sandys's mistress was the model for Morgan le Fay. 

The painting is held at the Birmingham Museum and Art Gallery in Birmingham, England. The museum described it as following: "Here she stands in front of a loom on which she has woven an enchanted robe, designed to consume the body of King Arthur by fire. Her appearance with her loose hair, abandoned gestures and draped leopard skin suggests a dangerous and bestial female sexuality. The green robe that Morgan is depicted wearing is actually a kimono."

References

External links
 Morgan-le-Fay at Birmingham Museum and Art Gallery

1864 paintings
Arthurian paintings
Collections of Birmingham Museum and Art Gallery
Paintings by Frederick Sandys
Witches in art